Rubus geniculatus is a European species of flowering plant in the rose family, with a few naturalized populations in the state of Virginia in the eastern United States. It has compound leaves with 3 or 5 leaflets, green on the upper side, pale green almost white on the lower side. Flowers are white. Fruits are dark purple, almost black.

The genetics of Rubus is extremely complex, so that it is difficult to decide on which groups should be recognized as species. There are many rare species with limited ranges such as this. Further study is suggested to clarify the taxonomy.

References

External links
Rense Haveman, Stellaria, where the light meets the ordinary color photos of Rubus geniculatus

geniculatus
Plants described in 1845
Flora of Europe